When the White Lilacs Bloom Again (German: Wenn der weiße Flieder wieder blüht) may refer to:

 A popular German song of the 1920s
  When the White Lilacs Bloom Again (1929 film), a German silent film directed by Robert Wohlmuth 
  When the White Lilacs Bloom Again (1953 film), a West German film directed by Hans Deppe